Diana Barrows (born January 23, 1971) is an American film and television actor, singer and dancer.

Filmography
 Rags to Riches (1987) (TV series) – (1 episode)
 Addicted to His Love (1988) (TV) – Marcy Brennan
 Friday the 13th Part VII: The New Blood (1988) – Maddy
 Charles in Charge (1988) (TV series) – Pushy Co-ed (1 episode)
 Freddy's Nightmares (1988) (TV series) – Diane (1 episode)
 She's Out of Control (1989) – Lisa
 My Mom's a Werewolf (1989) – Stacey Pubah
 The Favorite (1989) – Fanny
 Knots Landing (1989) (TV series) – Lisa (1 episode)
 Empty Nest (1990) (TV series) – Student No. 1 (1 episode)
 The Adventures of Ford Fairlane (1990) – Sorority Girl
 The End of Innocence (1990) – Arlene
 ProStars (1991–1992) (TV series) (voice) – Denise
 Space Case (1992) – Breezix
 Un homme (1997) (TV) – Margaret
 Does God Exist? (2007) (TV) – Burton's wife
 Naked Killer (2008) – Charlotte

References

External links
 
 

Living people
American film actresses
American television actresses
American women singers
20th-century American actresses
21st-century American actresses
1971 births